Borj El Amri or Bordj El Amri is a town in the Manouba Governorate of Tunisia.

The town of Borj El Amri municipality contains 6,458 inhabitants and is the main town (chef-lieu) of the Borj El Amri delegation which has 18,977 inhabitants.

It was created by a decree of the Bey of Tunis in 1904. At that time it was known as Massicault in honor of Justin Massicault, the Resident General of France in Tunisia from 1886 to 1892. It was renamed in 1961, it takes the name of Borj El Amri in connection with an ancient fortress (borj).

Borj El Amri is home to the School of the Tunisian Air Force and is served by the Borj El Amri Airport.

Climate

References

Notes

Populated places in Tunisia
Communes of Tunisia